The Haynesville Correctional Center  is a state prison for men located in Haynesville, Richmond County, Virginia, owned and operated by the Virginia Department of Corrections.  

The facility was opened in 1993 and has a daily working population of 1141 inmates, held at a range of security levels.

References

Prisons in Virginia
Buildings and structures in Richmond County, Virginia
1993 establishments in Virginia